Johnny Ridge is a mountain located in the Catskill Mountains of New York east-southeast of Hancock. Jehu Mountain is located north-northwest and Bittersweet Hill is located north of Johnny Ridge.

References

Mountains of Delaware County, New York
Mountains of New York (state)